The Goat of Mendes is the second studio album by English death metal band Akercocke. It was released on 11 September 2001, through Peaceville Records.

Release
The Goat of Mendes was released in standard and digipak CD format. The album included a music video for "Infernal Rites". A video for "Horns of Baphomet" was also released in 2001.

Dean Seddon, at the time vocalist of symphonic black metal band Hecate Enthroned, provided backing vocals for the track "The Serpent".

Reception

Akercocke drummer and lyricist David Gray has remarked that The Goat of Mendes is "in my opinion, our best album".

Track listing

References

Akercocke albums
2001 albums